Workin' It Back is a studio album by the American R&B singer Teddy Pendergrass, released in 1985. It was his second record for Asylum Records. The album didn't do nearly as well on the Billboard 200 as his last record, peaking at #96. It did reach US R&B #6, only two spots lower than his previous album. The album spawned two singles, "Love 4/2" (#6 R&B) and "Let Me Be Closer" (#67 R&B), though none made the Billboard Hot 100. The album has been certified gold.

Production
Pendergrass cowrote and coproduced two of the album's songs.

Critical reception
The Globe and Mail wrote that "the spasmodic anguish of the final cut, 'Love Emergency', is the most innovative song on the album, with the backup male chorus growling a chant over the groove as the background to Pendergrass's vocal flights." The Gazette thought that "even the Womacks can't raise a head of steam from the one-time Sound of Philadelphia."

Track listing
"Love 4/2" (Pendergrass, James Carter, Nathaniel Lee)
"One of Us Fell in Love" (Adrian Baker, Eddie Seago)
"Never Felt Like Dancin'" (Dennis Matkosky, Monty Seward)
"Let Me Be Closer" (Pendergrass, Linda Creed, Dennis Matkosky, Bill Neale)
"Lonely Color Blue" (Cecil Womack, Linda Womack)
"Want You Back in My Life" (Glen Ballard, Clif Magness)
"Workin' It Back" (Clif Magness, Ellen Schwartz, Roger Bruno)
"Love Emergency" (Cecil Womack, Linda Womack)

Personnel
Teddy Pendergrass - vocals
Ron Jennings, Paul Jackson Jr., Bill Neale, Cecil Womack, Clif Magness - guitar
Neil Stubenhaus, Doug Grigsby, Cecil Womack - bass
Dennis Matkosky - keyboards, synthesizer, drum programming
Monty Seward - synthesized guitar
Larry Williams - bass synthesizer
Randy Kerber - acoustic and electric piano, Fender Rhodes, synthesizer
Alan Pasqua, Eddie "Gip" Noble, Linda Womack - keyboards
John Robinson, Raymond Pounds, James Gadson - drums
Michael Mason - drum overdubs
Paulinho da Costa - percussion
Joel Peskin - saxophone
Tenita Jordan, Lynn Davis, Shirley Jones, Stephanie Reach, Monty Seward, Tammie Taylor, Clydene Jackson, Julia Waters, Maxine Waters, Vanessa Townsell, The Womack Congregation - backing vocals

Charts

Weekly charts

Year-end charts

References

Teddy Pendergrass albums
1985 albums
Albums produced by Glen Ballard
Asylum Records albums